Trattinnickia is a genus of flowering plants belonging to the family Burseraceae. It is in the Canarieae subfamily.

Its native range is from central and southern Tropical America (within Bolivia, Brazil, Colombia, Costa Rica, Ecuador, French Guiana, Guyana, Nicaragua, Panamá, Peru, Suriname, and Venezuela) and across the Caribbean to Trinidad and Tobago.

Known species
According to Kew:

The genus name of Trattinnickia is in honour of Leopold Trattinnick (1764–1849), an Austrian botanist and mycologist. 
It was first described and published in Sp. Pl. edition.4 Vol.4 on page 975 in 1806.

References

Burseraceae
Burseraceae genera
Plants described in 1845
Flora of Central America
Flora of Trinidad and Tobago
Flora of northern South America
Flora of western South America
Flora of Brazil